Spectrin beta chain, brain 1 is a protein that in humans is encoded by the SPTBN1 gene.

Function 
Spectrin is an actin crosslinking and molecular scaffold protein that links the plasma membrane to the actin cytoskeleton, and functions in the determination of cell shape, arrangement of transmembrane proteins, and organization of organelles. It is composed of two antiparallel dimers of alpha- and beta- subunits. This gene is one member of a family of beta-spectrin genes. The encoded protein contains an N-terminal actin-binding domain, and 17 spectrin repeats that are involved in dimer formation. Multiple transcript variants encoding different isoforms have been found for this gene.

Interactions 
SPTBN1 has been shown to interact with Merlin.

Model organisms

Model organisms have been used in the study of spectrin function. A conditional knockout mouse line, called Spnb2tm1a(EUCOMM)Wtsi was generated as part of the International Knockout Mouse Consortium program — a high-throughput mutagenesis project to generate and distribute animal models of disease to interested scientists.

Male and female animals underwent a standardized phenotypic screen to determine the effects of deletion. Twenty seven tests were carried out on mutant mice and four significant abnormalities were observed. Few homozygous mutant embryos were identified during gestation and those that were present displayed oedema. None survived until weaning. The remaining tests were carried out on heterozygous mutant adult mice. These animals had a decreased length of long bones, while males also displayed hypoalbuminemia .

References

Further reading 

 
 
 
 
 
 
 
 
 
 
 
 
 
 
 
 
 
 
 

Genes mutated in mice